Nam phrik is a type of Thai spicy chili sauce typical of Thai cuisine. Usual ingredients for nam phrik type sauces are fresh or dry chilies, garlic, shallots, lime juice and often some kind of fish or shrimp paste. In the traditional way of preparing these sauces, the ingredients are pounded together using a mortar and pestle, with either salt or fish sauce added to taste.

Nam phrik type sauces are normally served on small saucers placed by the main dish as a condiment or dip for bland preparations, such as raw or boiled greens, fish, poultry and meats. Depending on the type, the region and the family that prepares it, nam phrik may vary in texture from a liquid to a paste to an almost dry, granular, or powdery consistency.

Instead of khrueang kaeng or phrik kaeng, the words nam phrik can also be used to denote Thai curry pastes such as in nam phrik kaeng som for kaeng som or nam phrik kaeng phet for kaeng phet.

History
The first Westerner to report of nam phrik was Simon de la Loubère, a French ambassador to the court of Ayutthaya. In 1687–88 he noted that it contains "a mustard like sauce, which consisted of crayfish corrupted (fermented fish); which they called kapi." King Chulalongkorn, regarded as one of the greatest kings of Thailand, repeatedly stated during his tour of Europe in 1907 that, besides khai chiao (omelette), he most missed nam phrik. The chef David Thompson, an acknowledged expert on Thai cuisine, writes, "They are at the very core of Thai cooking and have fed the Thai from their distant past to the present."

Chili peppers originated in the Americas, where they have been cultivated for over 6,000 years. They were probably introduced to Asia, and Thailand, in the 16th century by Portuguese emissaries and traders in what is known as the Columbian Exchange. Before chili peppers were known and enthusiastically embraced in Thai cuisine, other spices such as black pepper, long pepper, and Sichuan pepper were used instead to achieve the desired "spiciness".

Selected types

[[File:Khao phat nam phrik narok.jpg|thumb|Khao phat nam phrik narok is rice fried with nam phrik narok; here served with grilled pork and a nam chim (dipping sauce)]]

Types of nam phrik vary according to the ingredients, the preparation and the region. Some may include tamarind, green mango, galangal, lemongrass, and/or mushrooms and even ingredients such as frog. If fish paste is used, it may be made in a variety of ways, by mincing dried, boiled, grilled or salted fish, or by using fish roe. In Isan, pla ra, giving an intense flavor, is often used. Some types of nam phrik may be sweetened with sugar. A Thai cook book from 1974 lists over 100 different recipes. Among the most widespread varieties, the following deserve mention:Nam phrik kapi is one of the most widespread varieties and is typical of central Thailand. It contains fermented shrimp paste, lime, chilies, and often pea eggplant. It is often eaten with fried pla thu and vegetables, among other dishes.Nam phrik kha is made with roasted chilies, garlic, galangal and salt. This northern Thai specialty is often served as a dip for steamed mushrooms.
 Nam phrik kung siap is a Southern Thai specialty popular in the provinces of Phuket and Krabi. It is made from crispy smoked dried shrimp (kung siap), shallots, garlic, bird's eye chili, shrimp paste and seasoned with lime juice, palm sugar, and fish sauce.Nam phrik long ruea (lit. "In the boat chili paste") is an elaborate fried nam phrik using several kinds of fruits such as Garcinia schomburgkiana and Solanum ferox, dried shrimp, sweet pork, and shrimp paste in addition to chilies, garlic and sugar. It is eaten with salted duck egg, fresh greens, and, for instance, sliced Zedoary ("white turmeric").Nam phrik maeng da incorporates roasted and pounded maeng da (Lethocerus indicus, a kind of Giant water bug) for its specific taste.Nam phrik narok literally translates to "chili paste from hell". It is made with dried chilies, shrimp paste, catfish, shallots, garlic, fish sauce and sugar.Nam phrik num, a thick northern specialty based on roasted green chilies, onion and garlic, is usually eaten along with vegetables, pork cracklings, and sticky rice.Nam phrik ong is a traditional specialty of northern Thailand made with minced pork and tomato.Nam phrik phao is sweetened with sugar and, among other ingredients, roasted chilies and tamarind."Thai Home Cooking", She Simmer's It is popular as a spread on bread or toast. It can also be used as an ingredient, for instance in tom yum or in the Thai salad with squid called phla pla muek.
 Nam phrik pla ching chang is based on small, local anchovies (Stolephorus) popular in Phuket.
 Nam phrik pla ra is made with pla ra as one of the main ingredients. Like most types of nam phrik, a little water is used if the mixture becomes too thick.
 Nam phrik pla salat pon (น้ำพริกปลาสลาดป่น), also known as phrik pla salat pon, is a variety of nam phrik with powdered, roasted, dry pla salat (Notopterus notopterus). All main ingredients (the dry fish, red dry chili and garlic) are previously roasted until crunchy. Shrimp paste and sugar are also added, and the mixture is pounded with a mortar and pestle. It is eaten with raw vegetables, and is popular in Khorat.
 Nam phrik pla yang is mainly minced, grilled fish, usually pla chon, mixed with onion, garlic, powdered chili, tamarind, shrimp paste, fish sauce and sugar.Nam phrik tai pla (น้ำพริกไตปลา), one of its main ingredients is tai pla, a sauce used in the southern Thai cuisine made with the fermented innards of the short-bodied mackerel.

See also
 Chili pepper pasteNam chim (another type of Thai dipping sauce)
Sriracha sauce
List of Thai dishes
List of Thai ingredientsSambal, the equivalent of nam phrik'' in Indonesian, Malaysian and Sri Lankan cuisine
 List of condiments
 List of dips
 List of sauces

References

External links

Chili pepper dishes
Dips (food)
Thai cuisine
Chili sauce and paste
Spicy foods